Psittacopasserae is a taxon of birds consisting of the Passeriformes (passerines, a large group of perching birds) and Psittaciformes (parrots). Per Ericson and colleagues, in analysing genomic DNA, revealed a lineage comprising passerines, psittacines and Falconiformes. The group was proposed following an alignment of nuclear intron sequences by Shannon Hackett et al. in 2008, it was formally named in a 2011 Nature Communications article by Alexander Suh and other authors working with Jürgen Schmitz's group, based on genetic analysis of the insertion of retroposons into the genomes of key avian lineages over the course of evolution during the Mesozoic Era.

Technical considerations

Analysis of retroposon insertions offers a higher degree of confidence because retroposon insertion is "virtually homoplasy-free", as retroposons insert at random positions throughout the genome, whereas point mutations in DNA cycle between only four possible options.  This makes it less likely that random coincidence or convergent evolution creates illusory similarities between unrelated groups.  However, the technique requires very extensive genomic data - in the 2011 paper, approximately 200,000 retroposon-containing loci were examined to identify 51 individual retroposition events which are present in some birds but not others.

Significance in the evolution of birdsong
Passerines are renowned as songbirds, and parrots share a capacity for vocal learning.  Thus it is possible that vocal learning, and the corresponding variety of song, was present in a psittacopasseran ancestor.

References

Neognathae